Enpinanga borneensis is a moth of the family Sphingidae. It is known from Thailand, Malaysia (Peninsular, Sarawak), Indonesia (Sumatra, Java, Kalimantan) and the Philippines (Palawan).

Description of adults
Adults are strongly sexually dimorphic.

Male
The forewing upperside ground colour is pale grey. There is a discal spot, a rounded dark broad spot, a rectangular dark brown spot and a slightly transparent cream spot. The hindwing upperside is mostly dark brown, although there is an inconspicuous buff median band.

Female
The forewing upperside ground colour is greyish brown, with a dark brown median line. The submarginal line is edged in dark orange brown. The discal spot is inconspicuous or absent. The hindwing upperside has a broad, straw coloured inner margin.

Larvae
Larvae have been recorded feeding on Dillenia (such as Dillenia suffruticosa in Singapore) and Tetracera species.

References

Macroglossini
Moths described in 1897